Diploschizia minimella is a species of sedge moth in the genus Diploschizia. It was described by John B. Heppner in 1981. It is found in the US state of Florida.

The ground color of the forewings is pale fuscous with some fuscous. The hindwings are fuscous. Adults are on wing from February to May and again from June to August.

References

Moths described in 1981
Glyphipterigidae